West Los Angeles College (West L.A. College or WLAC) is a public community college in Ladera Heights, Los Angeles County, California. It is part of the California Community Colleges System and the Los Angeles Community College District. It is accredited by the Accrediting Commission for Community and Junior Colleges. The school offers associate degrees including 18 vocational-oriented programs in addition to 25 transfer programs. The college awards more than 600 degrees and certificates annually in 39 fields.

Beginning in the fall of 2016, WLAC became one of only 15 community colleges in the State of California approved to offer a bachelor's degree. The bachelor's degree awarded at WLAC is in Dental Hygiene.

Athletics
The college's athletic teams are nicknamed the Wildcats. The teams were previously known as the "Hustling Oilers." The college currently sponsors 12 varsity sports, five men's, six women's, and one co-ed. West Los Angeles competes as a member of the California Community College Athletic Association (CCCAA) in the Western State Conference (WSC) for all sports except football, which competes in Southern California Football Association (SCFA).

Men's:
 Baseball
 Basketball
 Cheer (co-ed)
 Cross Country
 Football
 Track & Field

Women's:
 Basketball
 Cheer (co-ed)
 Cross Country
 Soccer
 Softball
 Track & Field
 Volleyball

The college athletic fields hosted Olympic track and field events at the 1984 Los Angeles Olympic Games.

Notable alumni

Jhené Aiko (born 1988), singer and songwriter
LaVar Ball, former basketball player (and football player), now businessman
Isaac Bruce, professional football player
Tre Capital (born 1995), rapper and songwriter
Rashied Davis, professional football player
Keyshawn Johnson, professional football player
Warren Moon, professional football player
Schoolboy Q (born 1986), rapper, also played on the football team
Ryan Sherriff (born 1990), professional baseball player

References

External links

Official website

California Community Colleges
Baldwin Hills (mountain range)
Westside (Los Angeles County)
Schools accredited by the Western Association of Schools and Colleges
1969 establishments in California
Educational institutions established in 1969
Two-year colleges in the United States